Christianity in the 18th century is marked by the First Great Awakening in the Americas, along with the expansion of the Spanish and Portuguese empires around the world, which helped to spread Catholicism.

Protestant Pietism, evangelicalism

Historian Sydney E. Ahlstrom identified a "great international Protestant upheaval" that created Pietism in Germany and Scandinavia, the Evangelical Revival, and Methodism in England, And the First Great Awakening in the American colonies. This powerful grass-roots evangelical movement shifted the emphasis from formality to inner piety.  In Germany it was partly a continuation of mysticism that had emerged in the Reformation era. The leader was Philipp Spener (1635-1705), They downplayed theological discourse and believed that all ministers should have a conversion experience; they wanted the laity to participate more actively in church affairs. Pietists emphasized the importance of Bible reading. August Hermann Francke (1663-1727) was another important leader who made the University of Halle the intellectual center. Pietism was strongest in the Lutheran churches, and also had a presence in the Dutch Reformed church. In Germany, however, reformed Reformed Church's work closely under the control of the government, which distrusted Pietism. Likewise in Sweden, the Lutheran Church of Sweden was so legalistic and intellectually oriented, that it brushed aside pietistic demands for change.  Pietism continues to have its influence on European Protestantism, and extended its reach through missionary work across the world.

The same movement toward individual piety was called evangelicalism in Britain and its colonies. The most important leaders included Methodists John Wesley, George Whitefield and hymn writer Charles Wesley. Movements occurred inside the established state churches, but there was also a centripetal force that led to partial independence, as in the case of the Methodist and Wesleyan revivals.

The American Great Awakening 
The First Great Awakening was a wave of religious enthusiasm among Protestants that swept the American colonies in the 1730s and 1740s, leaving a permanent impact on American religion. Jonathan Edwards, perhaps most powerful intellectual in colonial America, was a key leader. George Whitefield came over from England and made many converts.  The Great Awakening emphasized the traditional Reformed virtues of Godly preaching, rudimentary liturgy, and a deep sense of personal guilt and redemption by Christ Jesus. It resulted from powerful preaching that deeply affected listeners with a deep sense of personal guilt and salvation by Christ.  Pulling away from ritual and ceremony, the Great Awakening made religion personal to the average person.

It had a major impact in reshaping the Congregational, Presbyterian, Dutch Reformed, and German Reformed denominations, and it strengthened the small Baptist and Methodist denominations. It brought Christianity to the slaves and was an apocalyptic event in New England that challenged established authority. It incited rancor and division between the new revivalists and the old traditionalists who insisted on ritual and doctrine. It had little impact on Anglicans and Quakers.

Unlike the Second Great Awakening that began about 1800 and which reached out to the unchurched, the First Great Awakening focused on people who were already church members. It changed their rituals, their piety, and their self-awareness. The new style of sermons and the way people practiced their faith breathed new life into religion in America. People became passionately and emotionally involved in their religion, rather than passively listening to intellectual discourse in a detached manner. Ministers who used this new style of preaching were generally called "new lights", while the preachers of old were called "old lights". People began to study the Bible at home, which effectively decentralized the means of informing the public on religious manners and was akin to the individualistic trends present in Europe during the Protestant Reformation.

Roman Catholicism

Europe
Across Europe the Catholic Church was in a weak position. In the major countries, it was largely controlled by the government. The Jesuits were dissolved in Europe. Intellectually, the Enlightenment attacked and ridiculed Catholic Church, and the aristocracy was given very little support.   In the Austrian Empire, the population was a heavily Catholic one, but the government seized control of all the Church lands. The peasant classes continue to be devout, but they had no voice.  The French Revolution of the 1790s had a devastating impact in France, essentially shutting down the Catholic Church, seizing and selling its properties, closing its monasteries and schools and exiling most of its leaders.

Jesuits

Throughout the inculturation controversy, the very existence of Jesuits were under attack in Portugal, Spain, France, and the Kingdom of Sicily. The inculturation controversy and the Jesuit support for the native Indians in South America added fuel to growing criticism of the order, which seemed to symbolize the strength and independence of the Church. Defending the rights of native peoples in South America, hindered the efforts of European powers, especially Spain and Portugal to maintain absolute rule over their domains. Portugal's Sebastião José de Carvalho e Melo, Marquis of Pombal was the main enemy of the Jesuits. Pope Clement XIII attempted to keep the Jesuits in existence without any changes: Sint ut sunt aut not sint ("Leave them as they are or not at all.")  In 1773, European rulers united to force Pope Clement XIV to dissolve the order officially, although some chapters continued to operate. Pius VII restored the Jesuits in the 1814 papal bull Sollicitudo omnium ecclesiarum.

French Revolution
Matters grew still worse with the violent anti-clericalism of the French Revolution. Direct attacks on the wealth of the Catholic Church and associated grievances led to the wholesale nationalisation of church property and attempts to establish a state-run church. Large numbers of priests refused to take an oath of compliance to the National Assembly, leading to the Catholic Church being outlawed and replaced by a new religion of the worship of "Reason" along with a new French Republican Calendar. In this period, all monasteries were destroyed, 30,000 priests were exiled and hundreds more were killed.

When Pope Pius VI sided against the revolution in the First Coalition, Napoleon Bonaparte invaded Italy. The 82-year-old pope was taken prisoner to France in February 1799 and died in Valence August 29, 1799 after six months of captivity. To win popular support for his rule, Napoleon re-established the Catholic Church in France through the Concordat of 1801. All over Europe, the end of the Napoleonic wars signaled by the Congress of Vienna, brought Catholic revival, and renewed enthusiasm and respect for the papacy following the depredations of the previous era.

Spanish colonies
The expansion of the Roman Catholic Portuguese Empire and Spanish Empire with a significant role played by the Roman Catholic Church led to the Christianization of the indigenous peoples of the Americas such as the Aztecs and Incas.

In the Americas, the Roman Catholic Church expanded its missions but, until the 19th century, had to work under the Spain and Portuguese governments and military. Junípero Serra, the Franciscan priest in charge of this effort, founded a series of missions which became important economic, political, and religious institutions.

China
The bull of Pope Benedict XIV Ex Quo Singulari from July 11, 1742, repeated verbatim the bull of Clement XI and stressed the purity of Christian teachings and traditions, which must be upheld against all heresies. Chinese missionaries were forbidden to take part in honors paid to ancestors, to Confucius, or to the emperors. This bull virtually destroyed the Jesuit goal to Christianize the influential upper classes in China. The Vatican policy was the death of the missions in China. Afterwards the Roman Catholic Church experienced missionary setbacks, and in 1721 the Chinese Rites controversy led the Kangxi Emperor to outlaw Christian missions. The Chinese emperor felt duped and refused to permit any alteration of the existing Christian practices. He told the visiting papal delegate: "You destroyed your religion. You put in misery all Europeans living here in China."

Korea
In contrast to most other nation, Catholicism was introduced into Korea in 1784 by Koreans themselves without assistance of foreign missionaries. Some Silhak scholars devoted themselves to an intensive study of various philosophical and scientific texts written by Chinese and European scholars. Among those texts was Catholic theological books published in China by Jesuit. They believed Catholicism complements what was lacking in Confucianism. These noble intellectuals became the first Christians in Korea. Yi Seung-hun, the first Korean who was christened Peter in Beijing, on his return from China in September 1784, and formed a Christian community. The Christian community developed rapidly thanks to their ardent dedication to the mission. They translated books on Catholicism from Chinese into Korean for Koreans and constantly appealed to the Holy See to send priests for Korean people. As a result, Pope Leo XII established the Korea Apostolic Vicariate and to delegate the missionary work to the Paris Foreign Missions Society in 1828. Since then French missionaries came to Korea secretly. In 1846, Andrew Kim Taegon was ordained and became the first Korean priest.

Eastern Orthodoxy

Serbian Church
During the Austro-Turkish war (1683–1699) years, relations between Muslims and Christians in European provinces of the Turkish Empire were greatly radicalized. As a result of Turkish oppression, destruction of monasteries and violence against the non-Muslim civilian population, Serbian Christians and their Church leaders headed by Serbian Patriarch Arsenije III sided with Austrians in 1689 and again in 1737 under Serbian Patriarch Arsenije IV. In the following punitive campaigns, Turkish armies conducted many atrocities against local Christian populations in Serbian regions, resulting in Great Migrations of the Serbs.

Consequent Serbian uprisings against the Turks and involvement of Serbian Patriarchs in anti-Ottoman activities, led to the political compromise of the Patriarchate in the eyes of the Turkish political elite. Instead of Serbian bishops, Turkish authorities favored politically more reliable Greek bishops who were promoted to Serbian eparchies and even to the Patriarchal throne in Peć. In the same time, after 1752 a series of internal conflicts arose among leading figures in the Serbian Patriarchate, resulting in constant fights between Serbian and Greek pretenders to the Patriarchal throne. Finally, the Serbian Patriarchate of Peć collapsed in 1766, when it was abolished by the Turkish Sultan Mustafa III (1757-1774). The entire territory of the Serbian Patriarchate under Ottoman rule was placed under the jurisdiction of the Ecumenical Patriarchate of Constantinople. The throne of Peć was suppressed and eleven remaining Serbian eparchies were transferred to the throne of Constantinople.

Russian Church
In 1721, Tsar Peter I abolished completely the patriarchate and so the Russian Orthodox Church effectively became a department of the government, ruled by a Most Holy Synod composed of senior bishops and lay bureaucrats appointed by the Tsar.

Timeline

See also

History of Christianity
History of Protestantism
History of the Roman Catholic Church#Baroque, Enlightenment and revolutions
History of Christianity of the Late Modern era
History of the Eastern Orthodox Church
History of Christian theology#Revivalism (1720–1906)
History of Oriental Orthodoxy
Restoration Movement
Timeline of the English Reformation
Timeline of Christianity#18th century
Timeline of Christian missions#1700 to 1799
Timeline of the Roman Catholic Church#1600–1800
Chronological list of saints and blesseds in the 18th century

References

Works cited

Further reading 
 Atkin, Nicholas, and Frank Tallett, eds. Priests, Prelates and People: A History of European Catholicism since 1750 (2003) 
 Brown, Stewart J. and Timothy Tackett, eds. The Cambridge History of Christianity: Volume 7, Enlightenment, Reawakening and Revolution 1660-1815 (2007)
 Chadwick, Owen. The Popes and European Revolution (Oxford UP, 1981)
 Hastings,  Adrian, ed. A World History of Christianity (1999) 608pp
 Hope, Nicholas. German and Scandinavian Protestantism 1700-1918 (1999)
  Latourette, Kenneth Scott. Christianity in a Revolutionary Age. Vol. I: The 19th Century in Europe; Background and the Roman Catholic Phase (1958) 
 MacCulloch,  Diarmaid. Christianity: The First Three Thousand Years (2011) ch 21
 McLeod, Hugh  and Werner Ustorf, eds. The Decline of Christendom in Western Europe, 1750-2000 (Cambridge UP, 2004) online
 McManners, John. Church and Society in Eighteenth-Century France (2 vols. Oxford, 1998) 709–11.
 Rosman, Doreen. The Evolution of the English Churches, 1500-2000 (2003) 400pp

External links
Schaff's ''The Seven Ecumenical Councils

18
 
18